"Give Me A Shake" is MAX's 6th single released under Avex Trax. Until the release of this single, all of MAX's music was covers of Italian Eurobeat songs, "Give Me A Shake" is their first original Japanese language song. Upon its release the song debuted at #1 on Oricon weekly charts, becoming their first and only top charting single. The song brought the group their first Japan Record Award grand prix nomination and allowed them to make their first appearance on Kōhaku Uta Gassen.

Track listing

Charts 
Oricon Sales Chart (Japan)

References 

1997 singles
1997 songs
MAX (band) songs
Oricon Weekly number-one singles
Song recordings produced by Max Matsuura
Japanese film songs